Ivan Vladimirovich Teplykh (born 8 February 1985 in Pervouralsk) is a male sprint athlete from Russia. He finished fifth in the 200m final at the 2006 European Athletics Championships in Gothenburg.

International competitions

References

 profile at RusAthletics.com

1985 births
Living people
People from Pervouralsk
Sportspeople from Sverdlovsk Oblast
Russian male sprinters
Universiade gold medalists in athletics (track and field)
Universiade gold medalists for Russia
Competitors at the 2005 Summer Universiade
Medalists at the 2009 Summer Universiade
World Athletics Championships athletes for Russia
Russian Athletics Championships winners
21st-century Russian people